William or Bill Goddard may refer to:

 William Henry Goddard (1795–1872), English merchant in Gambia
 William Goddard (engineer) (1913–1997), American engineer for IBM and inventor
 William Andrew Goddard III (born 1937), American professor of chemistry at the California Institute of Technology
 William Goddard (printer) (1740–1817), American patriot and printer
 Bill Goddard (footballer) (1880–1939), Australian rules footballer